The China National Tourism Administration (CNTA) was a Chinese government authority responsible for the development of tourism in the country. The CNTA was subordinate to the State Council. Its headquarters are in Beijing, with regional branches in various provinces. The predecessor was the China Travel and Tourism Administration (later renamed the China Travel and Tourism Administration) established in 1964. It was once an agency directly under the State Council in charge of tourism.

CNTA does not have the authority of a full department within the Chinese government to enforce regulations, but in other respects it acts as a ministry. Provincial CNTA offices in each Chinese province report to the central office in Beijing. CNTA has eighteen overseas offices called CNTO (China National Tourism Offices) that are charged with promoting tourism to China. In Europe, there are CNTO offices in London and Paris.

CNTA is unique as a tourism office in that it is also responsible for controlling the outflow of tourists from China abroad.

Its headquarters were in Dongcheng District. The CNTA was dissolved on March 19, 2018; the duties are merged to the Ministry of Culture and Tourism.

List of chairmen
Liu Yi (刘毅, 1988–1995)
He Guangwei (何光暐, 1995–2005)
Shao Qiwei (邵琪伟, 2005–2014)
Li Jinzao (李金早, 2014–2018)

Agency Structure
The agency is organized into the following areas.

Office (Comprehensive Coordination Department)
Department of Policy and Legal Affairs
Department of Tourism Promotion and International Liaison
Department of Planning
Development and Finance
Department of Quality Standardization and Administration
Department of Affairs on Tourism of Hong Kong
Macau & Taiwan, Department of Personnel
Party Committee, Office of Retired Cadres

Directly administered agencies
Service Center of CNTA
Information Center of CNTA
China Tourism Association, formerly known as the China National Tourism Institute
China Tourism News Office
China Travel and Tourism Press
China Tourism Management Institute
China Tourism Management Institute

Subordinate Associations
China Association of Travel Services
China Tourist Hotels Association
China Tourism Automobile and Cruise Association and China Association of Tourism Journals

Tourist Attraction Rating Categories

The organisation administers the five Tourist Attraction Rating Categories, ranging from A (lowest) to AAAAA (highest).

See also
China Travel Service
Tourism in China
Tourism-related institutions in China
iperu, tourist information and assistance
Visitor center

References

External links
China National Tourism Administration 
 

Tourism in China
Government agencies of China
State Council of the People's Republic of China
1982 establishments in China
Government agencies established in 1982
Organizations based in Beijing
Tourism agencies